Wiper may refer to:

 Windscreen wiper
 Wiper, a Pakistani English term for a squeegee
 Wiper (occupation), a cleaner in the engine room of a ship
 wiper (malware), a type of malware
  Wiper, a term for a hybrid striped bass
  Wiper, a term for the moving contact on a potentiometer
  Wiper, another brand name for the Lawnbott
 Scott Wiper (born 1970), American writer, film director and actor
  Wiper (One Piece), a character from the manga and anime One Piece
  Wipers (band), an American punk rock group
 Wiper Democratic Movement – Kenya, a 21st-century political party
 The Wipers Times, a trench magazine
 Ypres, a city in Belgium known as Wipers by the British troops in World War 1